Gil Wheaton (born 1 November 1941) is an English footballer, who played as a centre half in the Football League for Grimsby Town and Chester.

References

Chester City F.C. players
Grimsby Town F.C. players
Rhyl F.C. players
English Football League players
Association football central defenders
1941 births
Living people
English footballers